Robert Henley, 2nd Earl of Northington (3 January 1747 – 5 July 1786), was a British politician.

He was born the eldest son of Robert Henley, 1st Earl of Northington, and educated at Westminster School and Christ Church, Oxford. He succeeded his father to the earldom in 1772, inheriting The Grange, Northington.

He was appointed a Teller of the Exchequer in 1763, a position he held until his death. He was also Clerk of the hanaper for life from 1771.

He was elected a Member of Parliament (MP) for Hampshire on 30 March 1768, and sat until succeeding as 2nd Earl of Northington on 14 January 1772, when he moved to the House of Lords. He was made a Knight of the Thistle on 18 August 1773. In 1783 he served as Lord Lieutenant of Ireland in the Fox-North Coalition, being appointed a member of the Privy Council on 30 April. A 1787 portrait by Joshua Reynolds is in the Art Gallery of South Australia.

On his death, unmarried and without a male heir, at the age of thirty-nine, his titles became extinct. His sisters (Lady Bridget Tollemache, Lady Jane Aston, Mary Dowager Countess Ligonier, and Lady Elizabeth Eden) inherited his estates.
They sold The Grange to the Drummond banking family.

References

External links
 
 
 HENLEY, Robert, Lord Henley (1747-86).  History of Parliament Online

1747 births
1786 deaths
People educated at Westminster School, London
Alumni of Christ Church, Oxford
Knights of the Thistle
Members of the Parliament of Great Britain for English constituencies
British MPs 1768–1774
Lords Lieutenant of Ireland
Members of the Privy Council of Ireland
Earls in the Peerage of Great Britain
Barons Henley